Juan José Rondón Airport  is a high-elevation airport serving the town of Paipa in the Boyacá Department of Colombia.

The runway length does not include a  displaced threshold on Runway 04.

On June 22, 2022, Colombian domestic carrier Easyfly is scheduled to begin service to Paipa from Medellin and Bucaramanga.

See also

Transport in Colombia
List of airports in Colombia

References

External links
OpenStreetMap - Paipa
OurAirports - Paipa
SkyVector - Paipa
Paipa Airport

Airports in Colombia